"We Like to Party! (The Vengabus)" is a song by Dutch Eurodance group Vengaboys. It was released in the Netherlands in May 1998 as the fourth single from the band's debut album, Up & Down - The Party Album (1998). Following its success in Benelux, it was given a worldwide release on 9 November 1998.

"We Like to Party!" became one of the band's most successful hits, topping the chart in Flanders, reaching number two in Australia and the Netherlands, and becoming a top-five hit in Germany, Ireland, Switzerland and the United Kingdom. It is also the band's highest-charting song in the United States, climbing to number 26 on the Billboard Hot 100, and in Canada, where it peaked at number 10.

Composition
"We Like to Party! (The Vengabus)" is a Eurodance song that runs for 3 minutes and 41 seconds. It is written in the key of A-flat major and maintains a tempo of 136 beats per minute in common time.

Critical reception
The song received positive reviews from music critics. AllMusic editor William Cooper described it as a "bouncy eurodisco hit", and noted further that it was "reminiscent of Aqua's "Barbie Girl", with its singalong chorus, cutesy female vocal squeal, and wacky synth beats." Larry Flick from Billboard wrote, "This wildly energetic foursome (two gals, two guys) from the Netherlands is pretty much a household name throughout Europe, where this infectious pop gem has been a constant on radio and in clubs. Already, "We Like To Party!" has gone platinum and double-platinum in Belgium and the act's homeland, respectively. Here, the song could meet a similar fate, especially since it features a sugar-soaked sing-along chorus that hangs out in your head until you beg for relief. That said, people who embraced Aqua's "Barbie Girl", Cleopatra's "Romeo And Juliet", and Los Del Rio's "Macarena" will be lining up for this latest slice of energetic pop. Are you listening, radio? (It's already hit No. 1 on the playlist of dance leader WKTU New York.) Conversely, this will be a no-brainer for club jocks, who continue to make major noise with the group's sweat-soaked debut, "Up and Down"." 

An editor from Daily Record called it "cheesy disco from Europe's top selling boy-girl band who are already lining up a massive summer single." Jim Farber from Entertainment Weekly commented, "Attention, lovers of cheeseball club music. The Vengaboys' hit "We Like to Party!" combines a campy disco beat, party-girl vocals, and a killer hook in the form of a ship horn in full blare. What began as a beach anthem in Ibiza, Spain, is becoming a Stateside smash on the increasingly Euro-driven U.S. charts. And why not? It's too willfully silly to resist." In an retrospective review, Pop Rescue remarked its "unmistakeable Vengaboys sound", describing it as "a fast-paced energetic track."

Commercial performance
The single proved to be a higher seller than "Up and Down" in the United Kingdom, where it peaked at number three in March 1999, eventually selling 474,000 copies, making it the 29th-biggest hit of the year. The song additionally reached number one in Flemish Belgium, number two in Australia and the Netherlands, number three in Ireland, number four in Germany and Switzerland, number six in Austria and Italy, number nine in New Zealand and number 10 in Canada and Walloon Belgium. It additionally reached the top 20 in France. The song became the group's biggest hit in the United States, peaking at number 26 on the US Billboard Hot 100 and selling 405,000 copies.

Music video
The accompanying music video for "We Like to Party" was directed by Wendelien van Diepen. It first aired in March 1999. The video features all four Vengaboys members and other tourists travelling to various destinations in Province of Barcelona, Piera and Gavà, in a 1930s style mini-bus, the "Vengabus" (a 1933 Chevrolet series O Bus), where they end up in a nightclub in La Barceloneta, Barcelona.

Track listings

 Dutch CD single
 "We Like to Party!" (airplay) – 3:42
 "We Like to Party!" (BCM XXL) – 6:21

 Dutch maxi-CD single
 "We Like to Party!" (airplay) – 3:44
 "We Like to Party!" (BCM remix) – 4:04
 "We Like to Party!" (more airplay) – 5:49
 "We Like to Party!" (original) – 4:06
 "We Like to Party!" (BCM XXL) – 6:21
 "We Like to Party!" (Baunz mix) – 4:45
 "We Like to Party!" (Full Schwingg) – 4:36
 "We Like to Party!" (D.J. Vanhaze Hitmix) – 7:01

 French CD single
 "We Like to Party!" (airplay mix) – 3:42
 "We Like to Party!" (more airplay mix) – 5:49

 UK CD1
 "We Like to Party! (The Vengabus)" (more airplay mix) – 5:49
 "We Like to Party! (The Vengabus)" (Klubbheads remix) – 6:05
 "We Like to Party!" (Tin Tin Out remix) – 6:30

 UK CD2 and cassette single
 "We Like to Party! (The Vengabus)" (airplay mix) – 3:42
 "We Like to Party! (The Vengabus)" (Jason Nevins remix) – 6:38
 "Up and Down" (BCM radio) – 3:28

 Australian and New Zealand CD single
 "We Like to Party! (The Vengabus)" (airplay edit) – 3:44
 "We Like to Party! (The Vengabus)" (Klubbheads mix) – 6:07
 "We Like to Party! (The Vengabus)" (more airplay) – 5:50
 "Up and Down" (video mix) – 3:40
 "Up and Down" (Tin Tin Out mix) – 8:14

 US maxi-CD single
 "We Like to Party! (The Vengabus)" (airplay) – 3:42
 "We Like to Party! (The Vengabus)" (Klubbheads mix) – 6:05
 "We Like to Party! (The Vengabus)" (BCM remix) – 4:03
 "We Like to Party! (The Vengabus)" (more airplay) – 5:49
 "We Like to Party! (The Vengabus)" (Full Schwingg) – 4:36
 "We Like to Party! (The Vengabus)" (DJ Disco mix) – 4:31
 "We Like to Party! (The Vengabus)" (Baunz mix) – 4:45
 "We Like to Party! (The Vengabus)" (BCM XXL) – 6:21

 US 2×12-inch single
A1. "We Like to Party! (The Vengabus)" (extended club mix) – 5:49
A2. "We Like to Party! (The Vengabus)" (DJ Disco mix) – 4:31
B1. "We Like to Party! (The Vengabus)" (Jason Nevins club mix) – 7:07
C1. "We Like to Party! (The Vengabus)" (Klubbheads mix) – 6:05
C2. "We Like to Party! (The Vengabus)" (Baunz mix) – 4:45
D1. "We Like to Party! (The Vengabus)" (BCM mix) – 6:21
D2. "We Like to Party! (The Vengabus)" (Jason Nevins dub mix) – 5:50

Charts

Weekly charts

Year-end charts

Certifications and sales

Release history

In popular culture
The song was revived when used in 2004 as the main theme for Six Flags' "Mr. Six" advertising campaign.

References

1998 singles
1998 songs
Colorado Rockies
Crazy Frog songs
English-language Dutch songs
Positiva Records singles
Songs about buses
Songs about New York (state)
Songs about parties
Songs about San Francisco
Songs written by Dennis van den Driesschen
Songs written by Wessel van Diepen
Ultratop 50 Singles (Flanders) number-one singles
Vengaboys songs